Nikolay Konstantinovich Kochetkov (May 18, 1915 in Moscow – 2005) was a Soviet chemist and academician (1979). He was awarded the Lomonosov Gold Medal in 1994.

Career
Kochetkov worked in the study of carbohydrates.

Published works
Special Issue: Synthesis and Structure of Glycans

References

1915 births
1999 deaths
Soviet chemists
Full Members of the USSR Academy of Sciences
Full Members of the Russian Academy of Sciences
Corresponding Members of the USSR Academy of Medical Sciences
Corresponding Members of the Russian Academy of Medical Sciences
Burials in Troyekurovskoye Cemetery